En saga (occasionally translated to English as, variously, A Fairy Tale, A Saga, or A Legend), Op. 9, is a single-movement tone poem for orchestra written from 1891 to 1892 by the Finnish composer Jean Sibelius. The piece, which likely began as a septet or octet for flute, clarinet, and string ensemble before evolving into an orchestral tone poem, premiered on 16 February 1893 in Helsinki with Sibelius conducting the Helsinki Orchestral Association. A decade later in 1902, Sibelius substantially revised En saga in response to an invitation from Ferruccio Busoni to conduct the piece in Berlin. It thus stands alongside The Lemminkäinen Suite (Op. 22), the Violin Concerto (Op. 47), The Oceanides (Op. 73), and the Fifth Symphony (Op. 82) as one of the most overhauled works in his . The Berlin concert, which occurred a fortnight after Robert Kajanus had premiered the revised version in Helsinki on 2 November, finally brought Sibelius the German breakthrough he had long desired.

En saga is without program or literary source. Nevertheless, the adventurous, evocative character of the music has encouraged many listeners to offer their own interpretations, among them a fantasy landscape (such as that by the Finnish painter Akseli Gallen-Kallela), a hunting expedition, a bard's storytelling, and the essence of Finnish people. Sibelius routinely declined to state a program, although in the 1930s, he conceded that, if one must find an inspiration, the tone poem owed its nature not to The Kalevala, the national epic of Finland, but rather to Iceland's Eddas. By the 1940s, however, Sibelius had reverted to his previous position, describing the work instead as "the expression of a certain state of mind"—one with an unspecified, "painful" autobiographical component—for which "all literary interpretations [were therefore] totally alien".

Critics have largely praised En saga as a masterpiece of "astonishing power and originality" that, stylistically, exhibits Sibelius's "personal brand of musical primitivism". Moreover, the revised version of the tone poem is often described as being of superior craftsmanship relative to the youthful rawness of its predecessor. The first (and to date only) recording of the original version was made in 1995 by Osmo Vänskä and the Lahti Symphony Orchestra. A typical performance of the final version of the piece lasts about 18 minutes, some 4 minutes fewer than its predecessor.

History

Composition 
Although the creative origins of En saga remain somewhat uncertain, it appears as though the material that would become En saga may have begun as, and thus evolved from, a septet or octet for flute, clarinet, and string ensemble that the composer had begun in 1890–91, during which time he was a student in Vienna under Robert Fuchs and Karl Goldmark. (This chamber piece, however, has never been found.) Following the success of the choral symphony Kullervo in 1891, Robert Kajanus, founder and chief conductor of the Helsinki Orchestral Association, requested from Sibelius a purely orchestral piece, albeit one "in a more popular style" that would not make "too great demands on [the general public's] powers of concentration and comprehension"; in the 1930s, Sibelius told his biographer, Karl Ekman, that the result of this invitation was the orchestral tone poem En saga.

Later in life, however, Sibelius dismissed Kajanus's influence, telling a second biographer, Eric Ringbom, in the 1950s that En saga actually had not been the result Kajanus's offer: "... Nothing came of it. Instead I completed the orchestral work I had already started and to which I gave the name En saga ... I did not comply with his request ... to write 'a short Da capo piece'". That Sibelius's statements to Ekman and to Ringbom are inconsistent is, perhaps, a sign either that Sibelius wished to downplay the influence of his on-again-off-again friend/rival decades after the latter's death (Kajanus had died in 1933) or that he was eager to dispel any notion that En saga was of less seriousness than his other compositions.

The autograph manuscript of the original 1892 version of En saga does not survive, although a manuscript and complete set of orchestral parts are preserved in the Helsinki Philharmonic Orchestra collection. The copyist for these documents remains unknown; although surviving invoices indicate that two copyists Sibelius typically employed, August Österberg and Ernst Röllig, each copied the score, in July 1895 and December 1898, respectively, neither the surviving manuscript nor the orchestral parts are in the hand of either man. Most likely the documents were produced in 1901 by an unidentified copyist for the conductor Georg Schnéevoigt, who conducted the original version of the tone poem during his concert tour of Riga.

Revision 
In 1902, the Italian composer, conductor, and pianist, Ferruccio Busoni, began a series of concerts (eventually 12 in all, from 1902 to 1909) with the Berlin Philharmonic at the Philharmonie's Beethovensaal (Beethoven Hall). According to Della Couling, Busoni's biographer, the concerts courted controversy from the beginning: Busoni's decision to feature new, modern (largely non-German/Austrian) music in a city famous for its devotion to celebrated homegrown talent only reinforced the perception in Berlin that Busoni was a bit of a "maverick". In June, Busoni invited Sibelius, his longtime friend, to conduct En saga (he also suggested as substitutes both the Second Symphony and the tone poem The Wood Nymph) at the beginning of November:

Sibelius seems to have countered with a choral work (possibly the recently completed cantata The Origin of Fire), since Busoni later replied, "Unfortunately I cannot give myself up to the uncertainty and inconvenience caused by singers ... Therefore, I believe we had better stick to the 'pure' orchestra". Although Sibelius remained undecided between the Second Symphony and En saga until October, he eventually opted for the tone poem in revised form. Sibelius took the decision to revise En saga while summering in Tvärminne (Hanko), as evidenced by a July 28 letter Axel Carpelan, Sibelius's friend and patron, wrote to his cousin after having visited the composer in Tvärminne. Nevertheless, delay ensued: Sibelius did not receive the manuscript in Tvärminne until (at least) September 24. Up against the November deadline, Sibelius raced to complete the revisions in a month, and to save time, he likely reused pages from the original manuscript that required little alteration. According to Wicklund, it is this technique that probably accounts for the fact that the autograph manuscript of the original version does not survive.

Performances 

The original version of the tone poem premiered on 16 February 1893 at Solemnity Hall of the University of Helsinki with Sibelius conducting the Helsinki Orchestral Association; the concert program also included Edvard Grieg's Peer Gynt Suite II and Robert Schumann's Manfred, as well as songs by various composers, all of which Kajanus conducted. As noted above, both Kajanus and Schnéevoigt included En saga on various subsequent concert tours.

German breakthrough 
Although Sibelius had overhauled En saga expressly for the Busoni concert, the premiere of the revised version of the tone poem fell not to Berlin but to Helsinki on 2 November 1902, with Kajanus conducting the Helsinki Philharmonic Society; the program also included Svendsen's Second Symphony and Bruch's Violin Concerto No. 1. While Finnish critics praised En saga, there was a palpable sense the Helsinki concert was merely a dress rehearsal for the big Berlin unveiling. The Berlin concert was indeed an important event for Sibelius: not only would it mark just the second time he had conducted abroad, but it would also give him the opportunity to present personally his art to a discerning Central European audience. Finnish critics sought to buoy Sibelius by writing that, in their opinion, En saga was worthy of performance abroad, while the Finnish newspapers promoted the forthcoming concert heavily. A few days later, the stakes became even clearer: the Berlin critics savaged the first of Busoni's concerts on 8 November, the program of which included selections from Edward Elgar's The Dream of Gerontius, the Overture to Camille Saint-Saëns's opera Les Barbares, and Christian Sinding's Rondo Infinito.

This was the environment into which Sibelius stepped as second on Busoni's 15 November program, which also included Frederick Delius's orchestral nocturne Paris, Théophile Ysaÿe's Piano Concerto, and Ödön Mihalovich's ballad The Death of Pan ("my fellow competitors", as Sibelius referred to them in a 12–13 November letter to his wife, Aino). Sibelius was under constant stress: during the journey to Germany, he labored over the orchestral parts, many of which contained copy errors; upon arrival, he fumed over being second on the program and was annoyed that the promised rehearsals had both been scheduled for 13 November. Nevertheless, the rehearsals went well and the players reacted favorably to the tone poem: as Sibelius told Aino, "It is so beautiful... Busoni even embraced me".

The Berlin critics' reaction to the second concert, however, was hostile. Otto Lessmann of Allgemeine Musik-Zeitung described the performance as "painful", noting acerbically, "If steps forward in art should be illustrated in such works, the muse would viel her head"; while, Rudolph Buck opined in Berliner Neueste Nachrichten, "After the complete fiasco of the second concert, the announcement that these orchestral concerts would be continued in the autumn of 1903 sounded little short of blasphemous". Nonetheless, it appears as though Sibelius emerged more or less unscathed; indeed, the consensus opinion was that En saga was "the only valuable work" on the program. The positive reviews in the wake of the concert clearly lifted Sibelius's spirits. Following the concert, a confident Sibelius recounted for his wife the quality of both his art and his conducting:

As Tawaststjerna notes, thanks to En saga, at last the "ice had been broken for Sibelius in Germany", a success for which he had long hoped. Sibelius celebrated as Busoni's guest at a "lavish" dinner party.

Instrumentation 

En saga is scored for the following instruments:
Woodwind: 2 flutes (2nd doubling piccolo), 2 oboes, 2 clarinets (in B), 2 bassoons
Brass: 4 horns (in F), 3 trumpets (in F), 3 trombones, tuba
Percussion: bass drum, cymbals, triangle
Strings: violins, violas, cellos, double basses

Arrangement for septet 
The creative origins of En saga remain somewhat uncertain, although Sibelius's statements to Ekman and Furuhjelm indicate the piece may have evolved from sketches for a septet or octet the composer had begun in 1890–91. To date, however, researchers have been unable to recover the pre-En saga chamber piece, either as a completed manuscript or unfinished sketches (again, if such a composition ever existed). Gregory Barrett, professor of clarinet at the Northern Illinois University School of Music, has nonetheless sought to reclaim this (purported) "lost chamber masterpiece", arranging in 2003 the original 1892 orchestral tone poem for flute, clarinet, two violins, viola, cello, and string bass.

Contemporary accounts that describe the Barrett septet as a "reconstruction" are inaccurate; because Sibelius's 1890–91 sketches do not survive, there is no way to know how similar Sibelius's own chamber piece was to the first orchestral version of En saga and, by extension, to Barrett's chamber arrangement. It is for this reason that the Barrett septet is not included on the 13-volume BIS Complete Sibelius Edition, a 2007–11 project billed as having recorded every note Sibelius ever penned.

On 14 June 2003, six musicians from the Lahti Symphony Orchestra joined Barrett (on clarinet) to premiere the septet at the Brahmssaal (Brahms Hall) of the Musikverein in Vienna, the city where Sibelius claimed to have composed his own (lost) pre-En saga septet/octet; the Austrian-Finnish Friendship Society sponsored the performance, while the Finnish Embassy hosted a reception after the concert. The Barrett septet was first recorded in May 2008 at the Sigyn Hall in Turku, Finland, by the Turku Ensemble and released on 12 July 2011 by Pilfink Records. Many reviews note the conspicuous absence of the tone poem's brass and percussion, although one of the performers, flautist Ilari Lehtinen, has argued the septet compensates by making "the intimate aspects of the work sound more personal and more heart-rending". Writing for Fanfare, Steven Ritter has praised the septet as "remarkable", noting that although "acute listeners will miss the brass and all the pomp and beauty of orchestral majesty that we associate with Sibelius", Barrett's arrangement  "has much to offer and loses little atmosphere". Carl Bauman, writing for the American Record Guide, on the other hand, has argued the musical material "doesn’t fare nearly as well here as it does in its orchestration".

Discography 

En saga is one of Sibelius's more commonly recorded tone poems, although it trails more famous compositions such as The Swan of Tuonela and Finlandia. The first recording was made in 1938 with Sir Thomas Beecham conducting the London Symphony Orchestra. To date, the only recording of the original 1892 version (22:23) is by Osmo Vänskä and the Lahti Symphony Orchestra under the BIS label (BIS-CD-800); it was recorded in May 1995 and appears on the album with the original 1915 version of the Fifth Symphony. The album premiered to considerable acclaim. Gramophone's James McCarthy characterized the record as perspective-changing, noting that the original versions of the pieces provided "fascinating material for comparison" and allowed "a glimpse of two familiar masterpieces in the making". Kurt Moses, writing in the American Record Guide, similarly commended the record for providing "rare insight into a composer's creative process", but cautioned that "while Sibelius enthusiasts will love it [,] ... this is not a 'must buy' for everyone ... [and] is not a substitute for ... the final versions of these works".

Notes, references, and sources

Notes

References

Sources

External links
 

Symphonic poems by Jean Sibelius
1892 compositions
1902 compositions